The fifteenth election to Glamorgan County Council, south Wales, took place in March 1934. It was preceded by the 1931 election and followed by the 1937 election.

Overview of the Result
By the 1930s, Labour had secured a comfortable majority on the council, and dominated the aldermanic bench. The 1934 election saw little change.

Boundary Changes
There were no boundary changes at this election.

Candidates
Many candidates  were returned unopposed.

Contested Elections
Most of the retiring aldermen were returned. However, two conflicts arose when retiring councillors sought the nomination at the expense of retiring aldermen, at Hopkinstown and Newcastle.

Outcome
Labour retained their majority, losing only one seat, at Pencoed. Their victory in the rural Cowbridge ward reflected their domination of county politics.

Results

Aberaman

Aberavon

Abercynon

Aberdare Town

Bargoed

Barry

Barry Dock

Blaengwawr

Bridgend

Briton Ferry

Cadoxton

Caerphilly

Cilfynydd

Coedffranc

Cowbridge

Cwm Aber

Cwmavon

Cymmer

Dinas Powys

Dulais Valley

Ferndale

Gadlys

Glyncorrwg

Gower

Hengoed

Hopkinstown

Kibbor

Llandaff

Llandeilo Talybont

Llanfabon

Llwydcoed

Llwynypia

Loughor

Maesteg, Caerau and Nantyffyllon

Maesteg, East and West

Mountain Ash

Neath (North)

Neath (South)

Newcastle

Ogmore Valley

Penarth North

Penarth South

Pencoed

Penrhiwceiber

Pentre

Pontardawe

Pontyclun

Port Talbot East

Port Talbot West

Porthcawl

Pontlottyn

Pontycymmer

Pontypridd Town

Penygraig

Porth

Swansea Valley

Tonyrefail and Gilfach Goch

Trealaw

Treforest

Treherbert

Treorchy

Tylorstown

Vale of Neath

Ynyshir

Ystalyfera

Ystrad

Election of Aldermen
In addition to the 66 councillors the council consisted of 22 county aldermen. Aldermen were elected by the council, and served a six-year term. Following the 1934 election, there were twelve Aldermanic vacancies (one vacancy due to the recent death of a sitting alderman).

The following retiring aldermen were re-elected:
William Bowen (Lab, Llanfabon)
David Daniel Davies (Lab, Pontardawe)
Rose Davies (Lab, Aberaman)
John Evans (Lab, Maesteg)
Johnson Dicks (Lab, Abercynon)
E.H. Fleming (Lab, Hopkinstown)
William Jenkins (Lab, Glyncorrwg)
Caradoc Jones (Lab, Llandeilo Talybont)
David Lewis (Lab, Tylorstown)
John Thomas (Lab, Port Talbot)
Rev D.H. Williams (Ind, Barry)

By-elections
Eleven vacancies were caused by the election of aldermen.

Aberaman by-election

Abercynon by-election

Barry by-election

Glyncorrwg by-election

Hopkinstown by-election

Llandeilo Talybont by-election

Llanfabon by-election

Maesteg by-election

Pontardawe by-election

Port Talbot by-election

Tylorstown by-election

By-elections 1934-37

Neath South by-election 1935
A by-election was held following the elevation of the Rev. Degwel Thomas to fill a vacancy on the aldermanic bench. Charles Percival Huins, a pioneer of the Labour movement in the Neath area and a former national president of the Shop Assistants Union comfortably held the seat by an unexpectedly large majority.

References

Bibliography

1934
1934 Welsh local elections
1930s in Glamorgan